Tualatin Hills is an American Viticultural Area (AVA) located due west of Portland and just east from the Oregon Coast Range in the upland hills of the Tualatin River watershed and encompasses elevations between . It was established on May 13, 2020 by the Alcohol and Tobacco Tax and Trade Bureau (TTB). It lies entirely within the northern most location of the Willamette Valley AVA in and around towns like Gaston, Forest Grove, Sherwood and Cornelius. The distinguishing features of Tualatin Hills are its soils, elevation, and climate.

Terroir 
The Willamette Valley is full of microclimates, varying aspects and more that have a profound impact on the wines grown there. Tualatin Hills is partially adjacent at its southern end to Laurelwood District AVA which was established with Tualatin Hills. The two AVAs are both noted for the Laurelwood soils consisting of exceptionally fine loess deposited over ancient basalt. The silt-sized sediment was formed by the accumulation of wind-blown dust produced by the grinding down of basaltic and other volcanic rocks by glaciers during the last ice age. However, Tualatin Hills also contains Kinton and Cornelius soils mixed with the Laurelwood soil while its adjacent AVA is primarily a concentration of its namesake soil.

Wine Industry 
The area lies in the heart of Oregon's Pinot Noir producing zone. It is home to some of the oldest vineyards in Oregon, including David Hill, Ponzi and Cooper Mountain. The AVA petition filed at the TTB in 2015 was led by Alfredo Apolloni of Apolloni Vineyards, Rudy Marchesi of Montinore Estate  and Mike Kuenz of David Hill Vineyard and Winery.

References

External links
 Tualatin Hills Washington County Visitors Association
  TTB AVA Map

American Viticultural Areas
Oregon wine
Geography of Multnomah County, Oregon
Geography of Washington County, Oregon
2020 establishments in Oregon